Bout Changes 'n' Things Take 2 is a 1967 album by Eric Andersen and was released on the Vanguard Records label. It is nearly the same album as his previous release, with changes in the song sequencing and the addition of additional instruments.

Track listing 
All songs by Eric Andersen unless otherwise noted.
 "Close the Door Lightly" – 3:49
 "That's All Right Mama" (Arthur Crudup) – 2:56
 "Blind Fiddler" – 4:49
 "The Hustler" – 4:51
 "Thirsty Boots" – 5:14
 "My Land is a Good Land" – 3:00
 "Hey Babe, Have You Been Cheatin'" – 3:36
 "Cross Your Mind" – 5:17
 "Champion at Keeping Them Rolling" (Ewan MacColl) – 4:30
 "I Shall Go Unbounded" – 4:28
 "Violets of Dawn" – 4:12
 "The Girl I Love" – 3:36

Personnel

Musicians
 Eric Andersen – lead vocals, guitar, harmonica
 Paul Harris – piano, organ
 Harvey Brooks – bass
 Herbie Lovelle – drums
 Debbie Green – second guitar on "Violets of Dawn"

Technical
 Joel Brodsky – photography
 Alice Ochs – photography

Eric Andersen albums
1967 albums
Vanguard Records albums
Albums with cover art by Joel Brodsky